Sabir Butt (born April 20, 1969 in Nairobi, Kenya) is a former professional male squash player who represented Canada during his career. He reached a career-high world ranking of World No.17 in May 1988 after having joined the Professional Squash Association in 1985. Winner of 16 PSA international events and 4 time Canadian National Men's Champion. He represented Canada during the 1987 & 1989 World Team Squash Championships. Sabir was also Mississauga Athlete of the Year in 1994.

External links
 

1969 births
Living people
Canadian male squash players
Pan American Games gold medalists for Canada
Pan American Games bronze medalists for Canada
Pan American Games medalists in squash
Squash players at the 1995 Pan American Games
Kenyan emigrants to Canada
Sportspeople from Nairobi
Medalists at the 1995 Pan American Games
20th-century Canadian people
21st-century Canadian people